The 1987 Atlanta Braves season was the 117th in franchise history and their 22nd in Atlanta.

Offseason
 November 17, 1986: Chuck Hensley was signed as a free agent with the Atlanta Braves.
 November 17, 1986: Trench Davis was signed as a free agent with the Atlanta Braves.
 February 2, 1987: Luis Leal was traded by the Toronto Blue Jays with Damaso Garcia to the Atlanta Braves for Craig McMurtry.

Regular season
 May 1, 1987: Houston Astros pitcher Nolan Ryan hit a home run off of Braves pitcher Charlie Puleo.
 August 17, 1987: Tom Glavine made his major league baseball debut. It was against the Houston Astros and Glavine was the starting pitcher. Glavine pitched 3.2 innings and allowed 10 hits and six earned runs. Glavine had 5 bases on balls and one strikeout.
 September 27, 1987: 48-year old Phil Niekro is signed by the Braves for one final major league start against the San Francisco Giants. Niekro had been released by the Toronto Blue Jays almost a month earlier. He pitches three innings, giving up six hits and 5 runs in a 15-6 loss.

Season standings

Record vs. opponents

Notable transactions
 April 1, 1987: Graig Nettles was signed as a free agent with the Atlanta Braves. 
 April 3, 1987: John Mizerock was signed as a free agent with the Atlanta Braves. 
 May 5, 1987: Doyle Alexander was signed as a free agent by the Braves.
 June 2, 1987: Mike Stanton was drafted by the Braves in the 13th round of the 1987 Major League Baseball draft. Player signed June 10, 1987.
 July 25, 1987: Joe Boever was traded by the St. Louis Cardinals to the Atlanta Braves for Randy O'Neal.
 August 12, 1987: Doyle Alexander was traded by the Braves to the Detroit Tigers for John Smoltz.

Roster

Player stats

Batting

Starters by position
Note: Pos = Position; G = Games played; AB = At bats; H = Hits; Avg.= Batting average; HR = Home runs; RBI = Runs batted in

Other batters
Note: G = Games played; AB = At bats; H = Hits; Avg. = Batting average; HR = Home runs; RBI = Runs batted in

Starting pitchers 
Note: G = Games pitched; IP = Innings pitched; W = Wins; L = Losses; ERA = Earned run average; SO = Strikeouts

Other pitchers 
Note: G = Games pitched; IP = Innings pitched; W = Wins; L = Losses; ERA = Earned run average; SO = Strikeouts

Relief pitchers 
Note: G = Games pitched; W = Wins; L = Losses; SV = Saves; ERA = Earned run average; SO = Strikeouts

Farm system

Notes

References 
1987 Atlanta Braves season at Baseball Reference

Atlanta Braves seasons
Atlanta Braves season